Yeshivat Or Etzion is a Hesder Yeshiva, religious high school, and religious army preparation high school. It is located in Merkaz Shapira, Israel. It was founded in 1977. Its Rosh Yeshiva is Rabbi Haim Drukman.

The "Yeshiva Gavoha" roll is approximately 220 students. Yeshiva Gavoha offers the full Hesder military service, but opts for an extra year of study in Yeshiva before the army service. This ensures that virtually all of the students in the Yeshiva serve in elite units, and as officers and in positions of authority.

Notable alumni
Yohanan Danino
Moshe Feiglin
Yossi Cohen

References

External links
Official website 

 Official Website (english)

Or Etzion
Educational institutions established in 1978